The 1931 Sewanee Tigers football team was an American football team that represented Sewanee: The University of the South as a member of the Southern Conference during the 1931 college football season. In their first season under head coach Harry E. Clark, Sewanee compiled a 6–3–1 record.

Schedule

References

Sewanee
Sewanee Tigers football seasons
Sewanee Tigers football